Rampal Upadhyay is an Indian politician.  He was elected to the Lok Sabha, the lower house of the Parliament of India from Bhilwara, Rajasthan as a member of the Indian National Congress.

References

External links
  Official biographical sketch in Parliament of India website

1935 births
2001 deaths
India MPs 1998–1999
Lok Sabha members from Rajasthan
Indian National Congress politicians